The Cugir is a left tributary of the river Mureș in Romania. It discharges into the Mureș near Șibot.

Course
The river starts at the confluence of headwaters Râul Mare and Râul Mic in the town Cugir. Both rivers have their source in the Șureanu Mountains. From Cugir, the river flows north and discharges into the Mureș near Șibot. In the final 3 km before the confluence, two branches split from the main river: one towards the left along the village Șibot, one towards the right along the village Balomiru de Câmp.

References

 Hidrografia Cugir 
 Bazinul Cugir 

Rivers of Romania
Rivers of Alba County